Jean-Louis Carle (7 October 1925 – 3 January 1975) was a French racing cyclist. He rode in the 1951 Tour de France.

References

1925 births
1975 deaths
French male cyclists
Place of birth missing